German Wine (German: Liebfraumilch) is a 1929 German silent film directed by Carl Froelich and starring Livio Pavanelli, Henny Porten and Paul Henckels. It takes its German title from the sweet white wine Liebfraumilch.

The film's sets were designed by Gustav A. Knauer and Willy Schiller. It was distributed by the German branch of Universal Pictures.

Cast
 Livio Pavanelli as Hans Hentschel, Weingutsbesitzer  
 Henny Porten as Klara, seine Frau  
 Paul Henckels as Ihr Großvater  
 Trude Lieske as Ida, ihre Kusine  
 Wilhelm Bendow as Assessor Hahnenkamp, Ida Bräutigam  
 Willi Forst as Laroux  
 Max Ehrlich as Black

References

Bibliography
 Hans-Michael Bock and Tim Bergfelder. The Concise Cinegraph: An Encyclopedia of German Cinema. Berghahn Books, 2009.

External links

1929 films
Films of the Weimar Republic
German silent feature films
Films directed by Carl Froelich
Films about wine
German black-and-white films
Universal Pictures films